Reuter House may refer to either of two historic houses in the United States:

Dr. J. A. Reuter House, The Dalles, Oregon
Louis and Mathilde Reuter House, Austin, Texas